Constans may refer to:

 Constans (320–350), Roman Emperor
 Constans II (630–668), Emperor of the Byzantine Empire
 Constans II (son of Constantine III) (died 411), co-emperor of the Western Roman Empire
 Constans (consul 414), Magister militum per Thracias and consul in 414.
 The Constant Factor, aka Constans, a 1980 Polish film
 The CONSTANS transcription factor, part of a florigen-producing pathway in flowering plants

People with the surname
 Jean Antoine Ernest Constans (1833–1913), French politician and colonial administrator